Big Bug may refer to:

Big Bug, Arizona, a ghost town
"Big Bug", a television episode: see List of Code Lyoko episodes#ep5
Bigbug, a French comedy film